Derveni may refer to:

Albania 

, a village in the municipality of Krujë

Greece 

Derveni, Achaea, part of the municipal unit of Diakopto, Achaea
Derveni, Arcadia, part of the municipality of Megalopoli, Arcadia
Derveni, Corinthia, a town in the municipal unit Evrostina, Corinthia
Derveni, Thessaloniki, a location north-east of Thessaloniki
Derveni (mountain), a mountain in the southern part of the Evros
Chani Derveni, a place located near Megara, Attica

Other
Derveni Krater, found at Derveni, Thessaloniki, near ancient Lete, Macedon
Derveni papyrus, found at Derveni, Thessaloniki, near ancient Lete, Macedon

See also 
Derveni (Metsovo)